Park Lane is an investment banking firm headquartered in Los Angeles, California which provides sports finance advisory services to a wide variety of clients in the sports industry.

History
Park Lane was formed in 2005 by former NFL lineman Andrew Kline.  Mr. Kline was drafted by the St. Louis Rams in 2000 but retired from the NFL in 2003 due to concussion-related injuries.  After rehabilitating his injuries, Kline made several successful real estate investments and shortly thereafter was part of a group that attempted to purchase an NHL franchise. After that transaction, Kline realized that there was an unfilled niche in the financial industry for specialized sports-related financial services.  He formed Park Lane to provide these services along with relevant sports experience. Since its inception, Park Lane has expanded its range of services far beyond acquisitions and sales of franchises and now also advises all types of sports-related businesses with a broad range of financial services.

Present

Today, Park Lane primarily provides M&A advisory, corporate finance, financial advisory, and restructuring to sports teams and sports-related businesses.  Park Lane has worked with teams and investors in the NBA, NFL, NHL, and MLS; past clients include the San Diego Padres, the Memphis Grizzlies, the Tampa Bay Lightning, and the Anaheim Ducks among many others.  Park Lane also serves sports-related businesses which have included Golfsmith, the Los Angeles Marathon, and the Digital Action Sports Network.

List of major transactions
In 2008, Park Lane provided buy-side M&A advisory for the acquisition of the Tampa Bay Lightning.

In 2009, Park Lane provided buy-side M&A for Golfsmith's acquisition of MacGregor Golf.

In 2010, Park Lane advised Michael Reinsdorf on the sale of the Stockton Thunder in the largest ever ECHL team acquisition, Retrieved July 7, 2010.

In 2010, Park Lane advised ElliptiGO, an early stage outdoor fitness company, on a capital raise to fund growth and product introduction.

References

External links
 Park Lane website
 Andrew Kline's BNET Business Network interview
 Bloomberg Business Week's snapshot of Park Lane
 Journelism's interview of Andrew Kline
 Park Lane article in LA Business Journal

Investment banks in the United States
American companies established in 2005
Financial services companies established in 2005
Banks established in 2005